Willie Patterson may refer to:

 Willie Patterson (writer) (?–1956), British comic writer
 Willie Patterson (baseball) (1919–2004), American baseball player

See also
 William Patterson (disambiguation)
 Willie Paterson (1913–1928), Scottish footballer
 Willis Patterson (born 1930), American musical artist and academic